Bunker Soldiers is a BBC Books original novel written by Martin Day and based on the long-running British science fiction television series Doctor Who. It features the First Doctor, Steven and Dodo.

Synopsis 
The first Doctor and his companions are trapped in Kyiv in the year 1240 as a murderous army sweeps in ever closer. To complicate matters, something alien is awakening beneath the innocent defenders.

References

2001 British novels
2001 science fiction novels
Past Doctor Adventures
First Doctor novels
Novels by Martin Day
BBC Books books